Okka Rau (born January 5, 1977 in Leer, Lower Saxony) is a female beach volleyball player from Germany, who won the gold medal at the 2003 European Championships in Alanya, partnering Stephanie Pohl. She represented her native country at the 2004 Summer Olympics in Athens, Greece and the 2008 Summer Olympics in Beijing, China.

Rau is playing for the volleyball department of the multi sport club Hamburger SV in Hamburg.

Playing partners
Stephanie Pohl
Mireya Kaup

References

External links
 
 
 Beijing 2008 Olympics Profile
 

1977 births
Living people
People from Leer
German women's beach volleyball players
Beach volleyball players at the 2004 Summer Olympics
Beach volleyball players at the 2008 Summer Olympics
Olympic beach volleyball players of Germany
Sportspeople from Hamburg